The Gardner-Bailey House at 124 West Swissvale Avenue in Edgewood, Allegheny County, Pennsylvania, was built in 1864.  The house was added to the National Register of Historic Places on October 1, 1974, and the List of Pittsburgh History and Landmarks Foundation Historic Landmarks in 1984. The main section of the house has a square floor plan with four rooms on the first floor linked by a central hall, an extensive staircase, and three bedrooms and a bath on the second floor. A large dining room is directly to the rear and followed by a large kitchen with servant's quarters. A detached carriage house with turntable is located at the rear of the property.

References

Houses on the National Register of Historic Places in Pennsylvania
Houses in Allegheny County, Pennsylvania
Houses completed in 1864
Pittsburgh History & Landmarks Foundation Historic Landmarks
Italianate architecture in Pennsylvania
National Register of Historic Places in Allegheny County, Pennsylvania